Mario César (born September 11, 1968) is a former Brazilian football player.

Playing career
César joined Japanese J1 League club Yokohama Marinos in 1992. He played one match in 1992 Emperor's Cup. Marinos won the Emperor's Cup champion. However he could only play this match and left the club end of 1992 season.

Club statistics

References
I love Marinos Mario

1968 births
Living people
Brazilian footballers
Brazilian expatriate footballers
Expatriate footballers in Japan
J1 League players
Yokohama F. Marinos players
Association football midfielders